Prince Albert Morrow (December 19, 1846–January 1, 1913) was an American dermatologist, venereologist, social hygienist, and early campaigner for sex education.

Dr. Morrow founded the Society of Sanitary and Moral Prophylaxis, the first Social Hygiene association in the United States, in New York City on February 9, 1905.  In 1910, this organization joined with various other Social Hygiene association across the country to create the American Federation for Sex Hygiene with Dr. Morrow as president. During the 1890s, he opposed plans for the annexation of Hawaii on grounds its population had high rate of leprosy.

Works (partial list) 
 Drug Eruptions: A Clinical Study on the Irritant Effects of Drugs upon the Skin (1887)
 Atlas of Skin and Venereal Diseases (1889) 
 (ed.) A System of Genito-Urinary Diseases, Syphilology and Dermatology (1893) 
 Social Diseases and Marriage (1904)

See also 

 Social hygiene movement
 Robert Latou Dickinson
 Maurice Bigelow

External links
 Biography

References

1846 births
1913 deaths